Maximilian I (6 July 1832 – 19 June 1867) was an Austrian archduke who became emperor of the Second Mexican Empire from 10 April 1864 until his execution by the Mexican Republic on 19 June 1867. A member of the House of Habsburg-Lorraine, Maximilian was the younger brother of Emperor Franz Joseph I of Austria. Previous to his election as emperor of Mexico, he was commander-in-chief of the Imperial Austrian Navy and the Austrian viceroy of Lombardy–Venetia. With nationalist sentiments rising in the Italian region of the empire, Maximilian unsuccessfully sought to temper them, resulting in the emperor removing him from the post in 1859. Maximilian was affronted at the act, damaging to the "good name of an archduke." Two years before his dismissal, he briefly met with French emperor Napoleon III in Paris, where he was approached by conservative Mexican monarchists seeking a European royal to rule Mexico. When Maximilian was first approached, he was not interested, but following his dismissal as viceroy by his brother, the Mexican monarchists' plan was far more appealing to him. Since Maximilian was a descendant of Charles V, Holy Roman Emperor, ruler of Spain when Spain conquered the Aztecs (1519-21) and brought Mexico into the Spanish Empire, until Mexican independence in 1821. Maximilian would seem to be a perfect candidate for the conservatives' plans for monarchy in Mexico, with his alluring royal pedigree. Maximilian was interested in assuming the throne, but with guarantees from France of support. Mexican conservatives did not take sufficient account of Maximilian's embrace of liberalism, and Maximilian took insufficient account of being a foreign outsider, no matter how high-minded his plans might be. At the time the idea of Maximilian as emperor of Mexico was first raised, it seemed farfetched, but circumstances changed making it a viable plan. 

Mexico had been engaged in bloody conflict in the 1850s between conservatives and liberal factions.  The liberals attained power in 1855 and promulgated a new constitution, strongly limiting the power of the Roman Catholic Church in Mexico and the rights of the army, the two institutions that conservatives saw as bulwarks of traditional power. Conservatives repudiated the liberal constitution and rebelled against the liberal government, touching off a three-year civil war. The conservatives lost on the war but continued to seek ways to return to power.  When the government of Benito Juárez suspended payment on foreign debts in 1861, there was an opening for European powers to intervene in Mexico. A coalition of European powers, France, together with Spain and the United Kingdom, occupied the port of Veracruz in the winter of 1861 to pressure the Mexican government. The Spanish and British both withdrew from Mexico after negotiating agreements with the Mexican government. They realized the intention of the French, who, along with Mexican conservatives, were aiming at regime change. The Mexican conservatives, with the help of Emperor Napoleon III, invited Maximilian to establish what would come to be known as the Second Mexican Empire, which also gained the collaboration of certain moderate liberals. With a pledge of French military support and at the formal invitation of a Mexican delegation, Maximilian accepted the crown of Mexico on 10 April 1864.

The Mexican Empire gained the diplomatic recognition of several European powers, including Russia, Austria, and Prussia. The United States, while it did not protest formally against the empire, continued to recognize the republican government with liberal Benito Juárez as the legal head of state. The U.S.  saw the French invasion as a violation of the Monroe Doctrine. The U.S. was unable to intervene politically due to its ongoing civil war. Franco-Mexican forces never completely defeated the Mexican Republic but pushed their troops to the border with the U.S. Juárez never left the country, but his Republican government was weak.  Republican guerrillas also continued to be active throughout the Empire against the foreign invaders and the foreign monarch. With the end of the American Civil War in 1865, the United States began providing material aid to Juárez's forces. In the face of a renewed U.S. interest in enforcing the Monroe Doctrine, French armies began to withdraw from Mexico in 1866. With no popular support for the regime headed by a foreigner and having alienated conservatives by Maximilian's liberal policies, the monarchy was doomed. Maximilian was captured after a last stand at Querétaro. He was tried and executed by the restored Republican government alongside his generals Miguel Miramón and Tomás Mejía Camacho in June 1867.

Early life
Maximilian was born on 6 July 1832 in the Schönbrunn Palace in Vienna, capital of the Austrian Empire. He was baptized the following day as Ferdinand Maximilian Josef Maria. The first name honored his godfather and paternal uncle, Emperor Ferdinand I, and the second honored his maternal grandfather, Maximilian I Joseph, King of Bavaria. His father was Archduke Franz Karl, the second surviving son of Emperor Francis I, during whose reign he was born. Maximilian was thus a member of the House of Habsburg-Lorraine. His mother was Princess Sophie of Bavaria, a member of the House of Wittelsbach. Intelligent, ambitious and strong-willed, Sophie had little in common with her husband, whom historian Richard O'Conner characterized as "an amiably dim fellow whose main interest in life was consuming bowls of dumplings drenched in gravy". Despite their different personalities, the marriage was fruitful, and after four miscarriages, four sons – including Maximilian – would reach adulthood. Rumors at the court stated that Maximilian was, in fact, the product of an extramarital affair between his mother and Napoleon II, Duke of Reichstadt. The existence of an illicit affair between Sophie and the duke, and any possibility that Maximilian was conceived from such a union, are dubious.

Maximilian's upbringing was closely supervised. Until his sixth birthday, he was cared for by Baroness Louise von Sturmfeder, who was his aja (then rendered "nurse", now nanny). Afterward, his education was entrusted to a tutor. Most of Maximilian's day was spent in study. The hours per week of classes steadily increased from 32 at age seven to 55 by the time he was 17. The disciplines were diverse, ranging from history, geography, law and technology, to languages, military studies, fencing and diplomacy. From an early age, Maximilian tried to surpass his older brother Franz Joseph in everything, attempting to prove to all that he was the better qualified of the two and thus deserving of more than second-place status, but with primogeniture, Maximilian was destined for secondary status.

The highly restrictive environment of the Austrian court was not enough to repress Maximilian's natural openness. He was joyful, highly charismatic, and able to captivate those around him with ease. Although he was a charming boy, he was also undisciplined. He mocked his teachers and was often the instigator of pranks – including even his uncle, the emperor, among his victims. Nonetheless, Maximilian was popular. His attempts to outshine his older brother and his ability to charm opened a rift between him and the aloof and self-contained Franz Joseph that would widen as years passed, and their close relationship in childhood would be all but forgotten.

During revolutionary unrest in Europe in 1848, Emperor Ferdinand abdicated in favor of Maximilian's brother. Maximilian accompanied his brother on campaigns to put down rebellions throughout the empire. Only in 1849 would the revolution be stamped out in Austria, with hundreds of rebels executed and thousands imprisoned. Maximilian was horrified at what he regarded as senseless brutality and openly complained about it. He would later remark, "We call our age the Age of Enlightenment, but there are cities in Europe where, in the future, men will look back in horror and amazement at the injustice of tribunals, which in a spirit of vengeance condemned to death those whose only crime lay in wanting something different to the arbitrary rule of governments which placed themselves above the law".

At a court ball in Vienna, Maximilian had fallen in love with a young Moldavian noblewoman, Viktoria Keshko (1835–1856), paternal aunt of the future Queen of Serbia. But the match was impossible for Maximilian since her family was Orthodox and did not belong to the reigning or former reigning ones.  When their romance was discovered, her father Ioan Keshko (1809–1863), who served as Russian Marshal of Nobility in Bessarabia, quickly sent her back home and forcibly married her off to her longtime admirer, local rich nobleman of Greek descent, Alexander Dimitrievich Inglezi (1826–1903), son of Dimitri Spiridonovich Inglezi (1771–1846).

Career in the Imperial Austrian Navy

Training and travel

Maximilian was a clever boy who displayed considerable culture in his taste for the arts. He also demonstrated an early interest in science, especially botany. When he entered military service, he was trained in the Imperial Austrian Navy. He displayed zeal in his naval career and his direct link with Emperor Franz Joseph enabled the diversion of resources to what had previously been a neglected service .

Maximilian embarked on the corvette Vulcain, for a brief cruise through Greece. In October 1850, he was named navy lieutenant. At the beginning of 1851, he embarked on another much more distant cruise onboard the SMS Novara. He enjoyed the latter voyage so much that he anticipated in his diary “I shall fulfill one of my most beloved dreams, a voyage by sea. I depart with my memories of my beloved Austrian homeland in a very emotional moment for me.“

This voyage took him to Lisbon, where he met the princess Maria Amélia of Braganza, daughter of the late Brazilian Emperor Pedro I. She was described as beautiful, pious, clever, and of a refined education. The pair subsequently fell in love. Franz Joseph and his mother approved of a prospective marriage between them. Unfortunately, in February 1852, Maria Amalia contracted scarlet fever. Her health worsened over the months, developing tuberculosis. Her doctors advised her to leave Lisbon and go to Madeira, where she arrived in August 1852. At the end of November, she had lost hope of ever recovering her health.  Maria Amalia died on February 4, 1853, which deeply shook Maximilian. 

Other travels in this era included Italy, Spain, Madeira, Tangiers, and Algeria. During his visit to Spain in 1854, he visited the tombs of his ancestors Ferdinand II of Aragon and Isabel I of Castile in Granada. Later travels took him to the Empire of Brazil.  In an 1859 letter to his father-in-law King Leopold of Belgium he wrote "It seems to me like a legend that I am the first descendant of Ferdinand and Isabela who since early childhood has thought it his mission to treat on the continent that has attained such gigantic importance for the fortunes of humanity."

Naval career
Continuing in his naval career, Maximilian learned to command sailors and received a solid education regarding the technical aspects of navigation. On 10 September 1854, he was named Commander in Chief of the Austrian Navy and was granted the rank of counter admiral. Amidst those naval experiences, he further developed his love of voyages and of getting to experience new, exotic locations. He visited Beirut, Palestine, and Egypt. 

As commander-in-chief, Maximilian carried out several reforms to modernize the naval forces. He was instrumental in creating the naval port at Trieste and Pola (now Pula), as well as the battle fleet with which Admiral Wilhelm von Tegetthoff would later secure his victories. He was however criticized for diverting massive funds to ship building from the training, sea going experience and morale of sailors. He also initiated a large-scale scientific expedition (1857–1859) during which the frigate SMS Novara became the first Austrian warship to circumnavigate the globe.

At the end of 1855, he sought refuge for his ship in the Gulf of Trieste during poor sailing weather. He was impressed enough to immediately consider building a residence there, a goal which he actually carried out in March 1856, when he began construction of what would later be called Miramare Castle, located near the city of Trieste. 

After the end of the Crimean War in March 1856 that brought a period of peace to Europe, Maximilian traveled to Paris to meet Emperor of the French, Napoleon III and his wife the Empress Eugénie,.  There he also met Mexican conservatives, who would later prove to be decisive in Maximilian's life. The Archduke would write about this initial meeting in his diary “although the emperor lacks the genius of his famous uncle, he retains fortunately for France, a grand personality. He stands tall over the century and shall surely leave his mark on it.”

Marriage to Charlotte of Belgium and personal life

In May 1856, Franz Joseph asked Maximilian to return from Paris to Vienna, stopping on the way at Brussels, in order to visit the King of the Belgians, Leopold I. On 30 May 1856, he arrived at Belgium where he was received by Prince Philippe, younger son of King Leopold. He was accompanied by the Belgian princes, visiting the cities of Tournai, Kortrijk, Bruges, Ghent, Antwerp, and Charleroi.  In Brussels, Maximilian met the only daughter of the king and the late queen Louise of Orleans, Charlotte of Belgium, and romance blossomed.  Leopold I, upon becoming aware of the couple's feelings advised Maximilian to propose. From the Belgian viewpoint, the marriage was highly advantageous, since the nation was newly established. Having been unlucky in love twice before, Maximilian's marriage to the daughter of a reigning European monarch was suitable and would seem to be happy conclusion to his bachelorhood. Maximilian proposed and was welcomed into the Belgian Court. He later remarked on the contrast of the Belgian Palace of Laeken to the splendor of the Imperial Viennese royal residences, not surprising since Belgium but was a small and new kingdom.

Prince George of Saxony, who previously had been rejected by Charlotte, warned Leopold I of the “calculating character of the Viennese archduke."  The son of Leopold I, the duke of Bravant, and future Leopold II, in contrast, wrote to Queen Victoria, who was Charlotte's cousin, “Max is a youth filled with ingenuity, knowledge, talent and kindness.” 

The engagement was formally concluded on 23 December 1856. On 27 July 1857 Maximilian and Charlotte were married in the royal palace of Brussels. Distinguished European royals attended the ceremony, including the first cousin of Charlotte and husband of Queen Victoria, Prince Albert. The marriage also enhanced the prestige of the newly established Belgian dynasty as the House of Saxe-Coburg and Gotha once more found itself allied with the powerful House of Habsburg.   

The marriage was not fruitful, producing no biological children. Historian Enrique Krauze suggests that Maximilian was rendered sterile due to venereal disease contracted from a Brazilian woman when he spent time in the country following his dismissal as viceroy. 

When they were Emperor and Empress of Mexico, they adopted on 9 September 1865 Agustín de Iturbide y Green and his cousin Salvador de Iturbide y de Marzán, both grandsons of Agustín de Iturbide, who had briefly reigned as emperor of the First Mexican Empire. Agustin's mother, Alicia Iturbide, an American who was born Alice Green, agreed give up her child. Soon after, she changed her mind and sent messages to Maximilian to renounce the adoption contract, but she was simply deported from Mexico without her child.

Agustin and his cousin were granted the title Prince de Iturbide and the style of Highness by an imperial decree of 16 September 1865, and were ranked next in line after the reigning family. In October 1866, as the Empire began to falter, Maximilian wrote to Alice Iturbide that he was returning her son, Agustín, to her care."

When the couple became emperor and empress of Mexico in 1864, Maximilian is said to have taken a mistress.

Viceroy of Lombardy-Venetia, 1857–59

On 28 February 1857, Franz Joseph named Maximilian as viceroy of Lombardy Venetia, an Italian-speaking region of the empire.  On 6 September 1857, Maximilian and Charlotte made their entrance to the capital Milan. During their stay there the couple lived at the Royal Palace of Milan and occasionally resided at the Royal Villa of Monza.  As viceroy, Maximilian lived as a sovereign surrounded by an imposing court of chamberlains and servants.  During his two years as viceroy, Maximilian continued the construction of Miramar Castle, which would not be finished until three years later. Charlotte's royal dowry aided in the construction. Her brother Leopold would remark in his diary that “the construction of that palace amounts to endless madness.” 

Maximilian worked on developing the imperial navy, and he organized the expedition of the ship Novara, which would turn out to be the first circumnavigation of the globe commanded by the Austrian Empire, a scientific expedition, which lasted more than two years from 1857 to 1859, and which involved the participation of many Viennese intellectuals.  Politically, the Archduke was strongly influenced by nineteenth-century liberalism, generally not a political position that those of royal blood adhered to. The appointment of the young progressive Maximilian to the office of viceroy was made in response to the growing discontent of the Italian population with the rule older Joseph Radetzky von Radetz. The appointment of an Archduke, indeed the Emperor's own brother, was also intended to encourage the local population's personal loyalty to the House of Habsburg. 

Charlotte made efforts to win over her subjects, speaking Italian, visiting charitable institutions, inaugurating schools, and dressing in native Lombard dress.  On Easter 1858, Maximilian and Charlotte walked down the Grand Canal of Venice in ceremonial dress.  Despite their efforts, anti-Austrian sentiment continued to spread rapidly throughout the Italian population. 

Maximilian's efforts in administering the province included a revision of the tax registry, a more equitable distribution of tax revenue, the establishment of medical districts, dredging the Venetian canals, expanding the port of Cuomo, draining swamps to put a stop to malaria, fertilization projects and the irrigation of the plains of Friuli. There was also a series of urban development projects. The Riva degli Schiavoni was extended to the royal gardens of Venice, while in Milan, the avenues gained priority, the Piazza del Duomo was widened, and a new plaza was built between the Teatro alla Scala and the Palazzo Marino. The Biblioteca Ambrosiana library was also restored. 

The British minister of foreign relations wrote in 1859 that “the administration of the provinces of Lombardy Venetia were directed by the Archduke Maximilian with great talent, and both a liberal and conciliatory spirit.”

Dismissal as viceroy

Maximilian's tenure as viceroy was short-lived, lasting only two years during a period of rising local tensions. Although holding title of viceroy, the viceroy's jurisdiction did not fully extend over the Austrian garrison, which was opposed to any sort of liberal reforms. Maximilian went to Vienna in April 1858 to ask his brother the emperor to grant him both military and administrative jurisdiction, while continuing a policy of concessions. Franz Joseph rejected the appeal.  That left Maximilian with only the limited role of prefect of police while tensions were rising in Piedmont. On 3 January 1859, for security reasons, Carlota was asked to return to Miramar, and she sent her valuables out of Lombardy Venetia. Only while safe in the royal Palace of Milan did she share her concerns with her mother Sofia.  

In February 1859, the Austrian military cracked down, making numerous arrests in Milan and Venice. The prisoners came from the upper classes and were transported to Mantua and various prisons throughout the realm. The city of Brescia was occupied by militia, while several battalions were camped on Piacenza, and on the shores of the river Po. Maximilian hoped to moderate the severe dispositions of General Ferencz Gyulai. Maximilian had just received permission from his brother to open the private law schools in Pavia and Padua. In March 1859, there were incidents between the Milanese police and the Veronese public. In Pavia, one of the states governed by Maximilian, Austria created a veritable state of military occupation. The Italian situation was becoming critical, and order could no longer be maintained without mercenary troops. 

The Austrian archduke's conciliatory efforts ultimately fell apart when his various projects for improving the wellbeing of the Italian public were shut down. Franz Joseph was intent on preventing any concessions to the populace. The emperor considered Maximilian too liberal and generous with the rebellious Italian population.  Franz Joseph relieved his brother of his post as viceroy on 10 April 1859. 

In Italy, news of Maximilian's dismissal was received with sarcastic enthusiasm by statesman there. A pivotal figure in the movement for Italian unification, the Count of Cavour, who declared that

Emperor of Mexico

Background to accession

After gaining independence in 1821 Mexico had soon divided itself into liberal and conservative parties, the latter of which had a monarchist faction. The failed monarchy of Agustín I that saw him forced to abdicate, swearing to remain in exile, met its final demise when he returned to Mexico and was shot in 1824. Nonetheless, Conservatives continued to see monarchy as a viable option. Monarchist plans had most clearly been laid out in an 1840 essay by the statesman José María Gutiérrez de Estrada, which argued that after two decades of chaos, the republic had failed, and that a European prince ought to be invited to establish a Mexican throne. Such ideas received official interest during the presidency of Mariano Paredes and during the last presidency of Santa Anna, but by the late 1850s the liberals had appeared to have achieved a decisive victory through the promulgation of the Constitution of 1857, which severely constrained the powers of the Roman Catholic Church and the Mexican army, two traditional bastions of conservativism.  Conservatives declared the Constitution null and void and formed a rival conservative government. The three-year civil war (1858-61) between liberals and conservatives was won by liberals on the battlefield. Conservatives regrouped after the defeat and sought external allies for their monarchist cause.

Mexican diplomat José Hidalgo had been officially tasked by the Santa Anna administration to sound European courts for interest in establishing a Mexican monarchy, but after the fall of Santa Anna in 1853 with the successful liberal Revolution of Ayutla, Hidalgo had lost his official accreditation and continued his efforts independently. Hidalgo's childhood friend, the Spanish noblewoman Eugénie de Montijo was now wife of Napoleon III, Emperor of France, and it was through her that Hidalgo managed to gain the attention of the French ruler. 

The name of Maximilian came up swiftly in discussions among the Mexican monarchists on potential candidates for a Mexican throne. It was perceived as impolitic to propose a noble from one of the nations involved in the expedition and Maximilian already had a reputation as a capable administrator from his time spent as viceroy of Lombardy Venice. In 1859, Maximilian was first approached by Mexican monarchists—members of the Mexican nobility, led by José Pablo Martínez del Río—with a proposal to make him the emperor of Mexico. The Habsburg family had ruled the Viceroyalty of New Spain from its establishment until the Spanish throne was inherited by the Bourbons. As a member of the House of Hapsburg, Maximilian was considered to have more potential legitimacy than other royal figures.  He was unlikely to ever rule in Europe due to his elder brother position as emperor and his disapproval of his younger brother's liberalism. In that year, he declined the offer, but several attempts were made by the Mexican royalist. Later it was decided to again to make the offer to Maximilian, and that Gutiérrez de Estrada, due to his pivotal role in the history of Mexican monarchism, was to be given the role of again inviting Maximilian to assume a Mexican throne.

In early 1861, the United States was embroiled in its Civil War between the slave states of the South that seceded and formed the Confederate States of America and the Northern free states that refused to recognize the secessionists' government.  They raised a massive army to fight for the Union. In these circumstances, the U.S. government could not enforce the Monroe Doctrine, which asserted U.S. pre-eminence in the Hemisphere and exclude foreign intervention. In July 1861, Mexican President Benito Juárez had suspended the payment of foreign debts that were contracted by the defeated conservative government, providing a pretext for foreign intervention. Juárez's government could ill-afford and no desire to pay off the debts contracted by those that had challenged its legitimacy to rule. The suspension was an opportunity that Napoleon seized to establish a French client state which could also serve as a buffer to the expansion of the United States. France gained the aid of Britain and Spain, which also had loaned money to the defeated conservatives, under the pretext of arranging an expedition simply to renegotiate Mexico's debt agreements. Plans for such an expedition were formalized at the Convention of London on 31 October 1861. 

Gutiérrez de Estrada received Maximilian's answer at the beginning of October. The Archduke would accept the throne on two conditions: first, the Mexican people themselves should spontaneously ask for him; and second, that he should also be assured of the support of France and Great Britain. Maximilian's older brother, Franz Joseph Emperor of Austria, now sent Count de Rechberg, the Austrian minister of foreign affairs to brief Maximilian on what lay in store in the case that France did militarily intervene in Mexico, and a Mexican plebiscite approved of Maximilian.

French invasion, Mexican conservatives, and Maximilian's agreement
In the interim, the agreement between France, Great Britain, and Spain broke down as it became increasingly clear that France intended to overthrow the liberal Juárez's liberal government of Mexico. France began military operations on April 1862. They were eventually joined by conservative Mexican generals who were not reconciled to their loss to the liberals in War of Reform. 

After Charles de Lorencez's expeditionary force was repulsed at the Battle of Puebla on 5 May 1862, Napoleon III sent huge numbers of reinforcements and placed under the command of Élie Forey. Even so, it took the French a year to take Puebla, and then the capital in June 1863. The French now sought to establish a friendly Mexican provisional government. Forey appointed a committee of thirty-five Mexicans, the Junta Superior who then elected three Mexican citizens to serve as the government's executive. In turn this triumvirate then selected 215 Mexicans to form together with the Junta Superior, an Assembly of Notables.

The Assembly met in July 1863 and resolved to invite Maximilian to be Emperor of Mexico. The executive triumvirate was formally changed into the Regency of the Mexican Empire. An official delegation left Mexico, arriving in Europe in October. Upon meeting the delegation, Maximilian set forth the condition that he would only accept the throne if a national plebiscite approved of it.  By February 1864 French forces controlled territory comprising the majority of Mexico's population. The Mexican plebiscite duly held in occupied territory "was a farce", but Maximilian accepted the proclamation that a majority of Mexicans voted in favor of him as Emperor. 

The crown of Mexico came at a high cost to Maximilian.  Although he had extracted promises from Napoleon to militarily support the regime, he was to be entirely dependent on him. Emperor Franz Joseph isolated his younger brother Maximilian by forcing him to renounce any rights to the Austrian throne or as an archduke of Austria. On 9 April 1864 Maximilian reluctantly agreed to the "Family Pact". Maximilian formally accepted the crown of Mexico on 10 April 1864, and set sail for his new kingdom.

Arrival in Mexico

In April 1864, Maximilian stepped down from his duties as chief of Naval Section of the Austrian Navy. He traveled from Trieste aboard SMS Novara, escorted by the frigates  (Austrian) and Thémis (French), and the Imperial yacht Phantasie led the warship procession from his Miramare Castle out to sea. They received a blessing from Pope Pius IX, and Queen Victoria ordered the Gibraltar garrison to fire a salute for Maximilian's passing ship.
		
The widespread doubts amongst informed persons concerning the wisdom of Maximilian's venture were reflected by the French colonel Charles du Barail, who while returning from arduous service in Mexico sighted the Novara during its Atlantic crossing.  Wrote du Barail: "If you succeed in bringing order out of this chaos, fortune into this misery, union into these hearts you will be the greatest sovereign of modern times. Go poor fool! You may regret your beautiful castle of Miramar!" 

The new emperor of Mexico landed at Veracruz on 29 May 1864, and received a sparse reception from the townspeople due to a yellow fever outbreak. The Imperial couple's arrival at the capital was more celebrated, with fireworks and hundreds of triumphant arches. Maximilian and Carlota were crowned at the Cathedral of Mexico City.  He had the backing of Mexican conservatives, nobility, clergy, some native Mexican populations, and numerous European monarchs, but from the very outset he found himself involved in serious difficulties, since the Liberal forces led by President Benito Juárez refused to recognize his rule. There was continuous fighting between the French expeditionary forces (who were supplemented by Maximilian's locally recruited Imperial Mexican troops) on one side and the Mexican Republicans on the other.

After a brief stay at the National Palace, the emperor and empress decided to set up their residence at Chapultepec Castle, located on the top of a hill formerly on the outskirts of Mexico City that had been a retreat of Aztec emperors and Spanish viceroys. Maximilian ordered a wide avenue cut through the city from Chapultepec to the city center and named it the Paseo de la Emperatriz, the project would survive him and the Empire and is today one of the central avenues of Mexico City, the Paseo de la Reforma. Maximilian also acquired a country retreat at Cuernavaca, a villa known as the Jardín Borda.

Rule

In the summer of 1864 Maximilian declared a political amnesty for all liberals wishing to join the Empire. His conciliatory efforts eventually won over some moderate liberals such as José Fernando Ramírez, José María Lacunza, Manuel Orozco y Berra, and Santiago Vidaurri, a former ally of Juárez. Maximilian's lack of understanding of the political situation on the ground in Mexico is seen in his offer to Juárez of amnesty and the post of prime minister. Juárez refused and continued to assert his role as the legitimate head of the Mexican state, despite being forced to decamp from the capital to Mexico's north.  He never left Mexico's national territory, continuing to be recognized by the U.S. government.  His presence denied Maximilian assertion of legitimacy as ruler. 

Maximilian's priorities now included reorganizing his ministries and reforming the Imperial Mexican Army. Having the Imperial Mexican Army under his control would have given him as monarch an armed force and draw on its traditional base of support, but Bazaine impeded that in order to consolidate French control.

During his short reign, Maximilian issued eight volumes of laws covering all aspects of government, including forest management, railroads, roads, canals, postal services, telegraphs, mining, and immigration.
The emperor issued laws that guaranteeing Mexicans' equality before the law and freedom of speech, and laws meant to defend the rights of laborers, especially that of the Natives. Maximilian attempted to implement a law guaranteeing the natives a living wage and outlawing corporal punishment for them, along with limiting their inheritance of debts. The measures faced backlash from the conservative cabinet, but were ultimately issued during one of Carlota's regencies. Labor laws in Yucatán actually became harsher on workers after the fall of the Empire. A national system of free schools was also planned based on the German gymnasia,and the emperor founded an academy of sciences and literature. Laws were published in Spanish and in Nahuatl, the Aztec language, which had the largest number of indigenous speakers. Maximilian appointed the Indigenous scholar Faustino Galicia as an advisor to his government. Galicia would also be named president of the Council for the Protection of the Impoverished. 

The regime established an immigration agency to promote immigration from the United States, including former Confederates, such as those who immigrated to Brazil; as well as from Europe and Asia. Colonists were to be granted citizenship at once, and gained exemption from taxes for the first year, and an exemption from military services for five years. Two of the most prominent migrant communities built during this era were the New Virginia Colony and the “Carlota Colony.”  

On August 1864 Maximilian took a state trip through the nation while Carlota reigned as regent, going to Querétaro, Guanajuato, and Michoacan, giving public audiences and visiting officials. He celebrated Mexican independence by commemorating the Cry of Dolores, in the actual town where it took place. In November, and December 1865, Carlota took a similar trip to Yucatán.

Court life

Maximilian lived for the most part at Chapultepec Castle, making occasional retreats to his villa at Cuernavaca, where he had also taken a mistress named Concepción Sedano. He preferred to dress plainly and also enjoyed wearing traditional Mexican fashions.   He enjoyed the Mexican countryside and would often go horse-riding, walking, and swimming.  On Sundays at Chapultepec Palace, Maximilian and Carlota frequently held audiences with people from all social and economic segments, including Mexico's Indigenous peoples. The royal couple also hosted multiple balls for Mexican high society.

Declining military situation
In April 1865, the American Civil War ended, and while the American government was reluctant at the time to enter upon a conflict with France to enforce the Monroe Doctrine, official American sympathy remained with the deposed Mexican president Benito Juárez. The U.S. government refused to recognize the Empire and also ignored Maximilian's correspondence. In December, a thirty million dollar private American loan was approved for Juarez, and American volunteers kept joining the Mexican republican troops. An unofficial American raid occurred near Brownsville, and Juarez's minister to the United States, Matías Romero, proposed that General Grant or General Sherman intervene in Mexico to help the liberals. The prospect of an American invasion to reinstate Juárez caused a number of Maximilian's loyal adherents to abandon his cause and leave the capital.Nonetheless United States refrained from direct military intervention, but continued to put diplomatic pressure on France to leave Mexico. 

A concentration of French troops in the northern republican strongholds of Mexico only led to a surge of republican guerilla activity in the south. While French troops controlled major cities, guerillas continued to be a major military threat in the countryside. In an effort to combat the increasing violence and in a belief that Juarez was outside of the nation already, Maximilian in October signed a decree authorizing the court martial and execution of anyone found either aiding or participating with the guerillas. The harsh measure was hardly unprecedented in Mexican history even resembling an 1862 measure by Juarez, but it proved to be widely reviled, being branded the Black Decree, and contributing to the growing unpopularity of the Empire. It is calculated that more than eleven thousand of Juárez's supporters were executed as a result of the decree. 

In January 1866, seeing the war as unwinnable Napoleon declared to the French Chambers that he intended to withdraw the French military from Mexico. Maximilian's request for more aid or at least a delay in troop withdrawals was declined. Carlota arrived in Europe in an attempt to plead for the Empire's cause but was unable to gain more support. After the failure of her mission Carlota was increasingly mentally unstable and she would spend the rest of her life in seclusion in Belgium, living until 1927.

Fall of the Empire
In October 1866 Maximilian moved his cabinet to Orizaba and was widely rumored to be leaving the nation. He contemplated abdication, and on 25 November held a council of his ministers to address the crisis faced by his government. They narrowly voted against abdication and Maximilian headed back towards the capital. He intended to appeal to the nation in order to hold a national assembly which would then decide what form of government the Mexican nation was to take. Such a measure would require a ceasefire from Juárez, who had no intention of conceding to someone whom he viewed as the puppet of the French invaders.

As the national assembly project fell through Maximilian decided to focus on military operations and in February as the last of the French troops were leaving, the Emperor headed for the city of Querétaro to join the bulk of his Mexican troops, numbering about 10,000 men. The liberal generals Escobedo and Corona converged on Querétaro with 40,000 men and yet the city held out. In the face of an increasing number of Republican troops, however, on 11 May, Maximilian resolved to attempt an escape through the enemy lines and make a break for the coast. This plan was sabotaged by Colonel Miguel López who had come to an agreement with Republican General Escobedo to open the gate to the Republican forces. López appears to have assumed that Maximilian would be allowed to escape.

The city fell on 15 May 1867, and Maximilian was captured the next morning after a failed attempt to escape through Republican lines by a loyal hussar cavalry brigade led by Felix Salm-Salm. Maximilian was captured  along with his generals Mejía and Miramon.

Execution

Maximilian's trial began on 13 June, in the Teatro Iturbide of Querétaro, and he was charged with conspiring to overthrow the Mexican government and with carrying out the Black Decree. Maximilian's lawyers, which included the conservative statesman Rafael Martínez de la Torre attempted to defend the legitimacy of the Empire and Maximilian's benevolent rule.  After only one day the court returned a verdict of guilty and sentenced Maximilian to death.

A number of the crowned heads of Europe and other prominent figures (including the eminent liberals Victor Hugo and Giuseppe Garibaldi) sent telegrams and letters to Mexico requesting that the Emperor's life be spared.

Although he respected Maximilian on a personal level, Juárez refused to commute the sentence because he believed it was necessary to send a message that Mexico would not tolerate any more foreign interventions. 

Felix Salm-Salm and his wife devised a plan to allow Maximilian to escape execution by bribing his jailors. However, Maximilian would not go through with the plan unless Generals Miramón and Mejía could accompany him and because he felt that shaving his beard to avoid recognition would undermine his dignity if he were to be recaptured. 

The sentence was carried out in the Cerro de las Campanas at 6:40 a.m. on the morning of 19 June 1867, when Maximilian, along with Miramón and Mejía, was executed by a firing squad. He spoke only in Spanish and gave each of his executioners a gold coin in traditional European aristocratic fashion. His last words were, "I forgive everyone, and I ask everyone to forgive me. May my blood which is about to be spilled end the bloodshed which has been experienced in my new motherland. Long live Mexico! Long live its independence!"
After Maximilian's execution, his body was embalmed and displayed in Mexico. Early the following year, the Austrian admiral Wilhelm von Tegetthoff was sent to Mexico aboard SMS Novara to take the late emperor's body back to Austria. After arriving in Trieste, the coffin was taken to Vienna and placed in the Imperial Crypt on 18 January 1868. The Emperor Maximilian Memorial Chapel was constructed on the hill where his execution took place.

Cultural depictions and portrayals

Maximilian's execution was portrayed in a series of three paintings by French painter Édouard Manet, who had Republican sympathies. His third depiction of the execution shows the Mexican soldiers wearing "uniforms almost identical to French troops, and the man preparing for the coup de grâce shares the conspicuous features of Napoleon III. The implication was clear: Napoleon III had blood on his hands. Unsurprisingly, the painting was banned from public display in Paris" 

In the wake of his death, carte-de-visite cards with photographs commemorating his execution circulated both among his followers and among those who wished to celebrate his death. One such card featured a photograph of the shirt he wore to his execution, riddled with bullet holes.

Composer Franz Liszt included a "Marche funèbre, en mémoire de Maximilian I, empereur de Mexique" (a funeral march, in memory of Maximilian I, Emperor of Mexico) among the pieces in his famous collection of piano pieces entitled Années de pèlerinage.

In Vienna, mementos of Emperor Maximilian I of Mexico are on display at the Schatzkammer Museum in the Hofburg Palace in Vienna. A statue of Maximilian stands today in the 13th district of Vienna in front of the entrance to the Schönbrunn Palace Park. In Bad Ischl, the Maximilian fountain on the Traun, built in 1868, is a reminder of him. 

In Italy, there is a statue of Maximilian is in Trieste, brought back to its original place, Piazza Venezia, from the park of the Miramare Castle in 2009. Maximilian now “overlooks” part of the port of Trieste again. The Rostrata Columna, dedicated to him in 1876 in Maximilian Park in Pula, a work by Heinrich von Ferstel, was brought to Venice in 1919 as Italian spoils of war and is now, rededicated, on the edge of the Giardini pubblici.

There are portrayals of Maximilian on stage, in film and television. In theater, the play by Franz Werfel Juarez and Maximilian focuses on the two historical figures; it was performed in Berlin in 1924, directed by Max Reinhardt. In cinema, the 1934 Mexican film Juárez y Maximiliano he is played by Enrique Herrera; in the 1939 American film Juarez by Brian Aherne. In the 1939 film The Mad Empress, about his wife, Maximilian was played by Conrad Nagel. Maximilian is portrayed in one scene in the 1954 American film Vera Cruz, played by George Macready.  In the Mexican telenovela El Vuelo del Águila, Maximilian was portrayed by Mexican actor Mario Iván Martínez. The German-produced  Netflix historical drama The Empress, premiering in 2022, centers on the life of Empress Elisabeth of Austria, Maximilian's sister-in-law. Maximilian, played by actor Johannes Nussbaum, is portrayed in an unfavorable light.

In literary fiction, Harry Turtledove's 1997 alternative history novel How Few Remain where the Confederate States of America won the American Civil War, Maximillian is still Emperor in 1881 and sells the provinces of Sonora and Chihuahua to the Confederacy for CS $3,000,000 because his country is financially-strapped.

Conspiracy theorists writing in German allege Maximilian was not executed and that, having entered a secret agreement with Juárez, lived in exile in El Salvador as Justo Armas until 1936.

Legacy
Maximilian has been praised by some historians for his liberal reforms, genuine desire to help the people of Mexico, refusal to desert his loyal followers, and personal bravery during the siege of Querétaro. Other researchers consider him short-sighted in political and military affairs, and unwilling to restore republican ideals in Mexico even during the imminent collapse of the Second Mexican Empire. 

In Mexico, there are no statues to Maximilian, but during the regime of Porfirio Díaz, a liberal army general who fought against the French, the Emperor Maximilian Memorial Chapel was built on the site of his and his generals' execution on the Cerro de las Campanas in Querétaro.  Reportedly anti-republican and anti-liberal political groups who advocate the Second Mexican Empire, such as the Nationalist Front of Mexico, gather every year in Querétaro to commemorate the execution of Maximilian and his followers. 

With the 1867 execution of Maximilian, the second emperor of Mexico to have met that fate following that of Agustín I of Mexico, monarchism in Mexico was no longer a goal of Mexican conservatives. Members of the House of Hapsburg might consider Maximilian as an important ancestor. The nearest living agnatic relative to Maximilian is the head of the Habsburg family, Karl von Habsburg, and members of the House of Habsburg-Lorraine still reside in Mexico, among them Carlos Felipe de Habsburgo, the first male of the former ruling house to be born in the country. Carlos Felipe is an academic who has given many interviews, conferences, and presentations regarding his family's history, Maximilian and Carlota, and the Second Mexican Empire.

Honours

  Mexican Empire:
 Sovereign of the Imperial Order of the Mexican Eagle, 1865
 Sovereign of the Imperial Order of Guadalupe
Foreign

Arms

See also
 List of heads of state of Mexico
 Column of Pedro IV
 List of people from Morelos, Mexico
 Acapantzingo, Cuernavaca

Notes

References

Further reading

In English
 Corti, Egon. Maximilian and Charlotte of Mexico. 2 vols. New York: Knopf 1928.
 Cunningham, Michele. Mexico and the Foreign Policy of Napoleon III (2001) 251 pp.  online PhD version
 Duncan, Robert H. "Political Legitimization and Maximilian's Second Empire in Mexico, 1864-1867." Mexican Studies/Estudios Mexicanos 12 (1996) 273-300.
Duncan, Robert H. "Embracing a Suitable Past: Independence Celebrations under Mexico's Second Empire, 1864–6." Journal of Latin American Studies 30.2 (1998): 249-277.
 
 Hanna, Alfred Jackson, and Kathryn Abbey Hanna. Napoleon III and Mexico: American Triumph over Monarchy (1971).
 
 
 
 
 
 Krauze, Enrique (1997). Mexico: Biography of Power: A History of Modern Mexico, 1810-1996. New York: HarperCollins. 
 Mayo, C.M. The Last Prince of the Mexican Empire. Cave Creek AZ:Unbridled Books 2009.
   excerpt
 
 
 *Duncan, Robert H. "Embracing a Suitable Past: Independence Celebrations under Mexico's Second Empire, 1864–6." Journal of Latin American Studies 30.2 (1998): 249-277.
 
 Shawcross, Edward. The Last Emperor of Mexico: A Disaster in the New World. London: Faber & Faber, 2022; The Last Emperor of Mexico: The Dramatic Story of the Habsburg Archduke Who Created a Kingdom in the New World. New York: Basic Books, 2021.

In other languages

External links
 Recollections of my life by Maximilian I of Mexico Vol. I at archive.org
 Recollections of my life by Maximilian I of Mexico Vol. II at archive.org
 Recollections of my life by Maximilian I of Mexico Vol. III at archive.org
 Maximilian in Mexico at archive.org
 Monroe Doctrine (1823) at ourdocuments.gov
 The Present Condition of Mexico: Message from the President of the United States in Answer to Resolution of the House of the 3d of March Last, Transmitting Report from the Department of State Regarding the Present Condition of Mexico (1862) at Google Books
 Song: "Get Out of Mexico!" on IMSLP

  
Mexican emperors
1832 births
1867 deaths
1850s in Mexico
1860s in Mexico
Austrian Empire emigrants to Mexico
Austrian people executed abroad
Austrian royalty
House of Habsburg-Lorraine
People executed by Mexico by firing squad
People from Hietzing
People who were court-martialed
Pretenders to the Mexican throne
Second French Empire
Second French intervention in Mexico
19th-century rulers in North America
19th-century monarchs in North America
Dethroned monarchs
Monarchs taken prisoner in wartime
Knights of the Golden Fleece of Austria
Grand Crosses of the Order of Saint Stephen of Hungary
Knights of the Order of Saint Joseph
Grand Croix of the Légion d'honneur
Knights Grand Cross of the Order of Pope Pius IX
Knights of the Holy Sepulchre
Knights of Malta
Recipients of the Order of the White Eagle (Russia)
Recipients of the Order of St. Anna, 1st class
Burials at the Imperial Crypt
Executed monarchs